Colm Imbert is the Minister of Finance since September 2015 and Member of Parliament for the constituency of Diego Martin North/East, which he has represented since December 1991.

During his lengthy parliamentary career, Imbert has served in numerous government positions. He was previously Minister of Health (2001–2003), Minister of Science, Technology and Tertiary Education (2003–2005), Minister of Works and Transport (1991–1995 and 2005–2010), Minister of Local Government (1993–1995), Chairman of the Public Accounts Committee of the Parliament of Trinidad and Tobago 2010-2015) as well as Leader of Government Business in the House of Representatives (2007–2010).

References

Living people
1957 births
Members of the House of Representatives (Trinidad and Tobago)
Finance ministers of Trinidad and Tobago
Government ministers of Trinidad and Tobago
University of the West Indies alumni
People's National Movement politicians